The Pavilion Theatre was a theatre in Torquay, Devon, England. It was one of the three main auditoriums in Torbay, and during the 1970s differed from the Princess Theatre, Torquay, and the Festival Theatre, Paignton, in that it had plays rather than variety shows during the lucrative summer seasons.

Building

From 1890 to 1930, the Borough Engineer of Torbay, Henry Augustus Garrett, laid out the Princess Gardens, the Terrace Walk, Pier Pavilion and Torquay Pavilion on Torquay seafront. The Pavilion's architect was Edward Rogers, who drew up the final plans with HC Goss. The plans were passed in 1903, but construction did not start until 1911 due to Rogers’ death, and the work was taken over by Garrett. Part of its site is on land reclaimed from the sea, and it was built on a concrete raft on which a steel framework was erected. It is faced with white tiles made of Doulton's Carrara-enamelled stoneware. Its central copper-covered dome is topped with a life-size figure of Britannia and two smaller domes on each side bear figures of Mercury. Finely sculpted Art Nouveau-style cast iron edges the steps to the promenade deck and the octagonal bandstands or summer houses.

The Pavilion opened on Saturday 17 August  1912 and apart from the foyer and auditorium, it had lounges and a cafe, all of which were panelled with oak. A municipal orchestra was founded and many famous conductors and singers performed here.

It was proposed to demolish the building in 1973, but was listed in the same year. It closed in 1976, when it was leased to Rank Organisation and the interior was destroyed in adaptations for various types of amusements, first as a skating rink and in the 1980s as a shopping arcade. As of July 2020, it is closed awaiting restoration; the steel girders which form its framework are heavily corroded. It has Grade II listed status.

Shows
Over the years the theatre entertained millions of people. In the last few years of its existence it was simultaneously known as the Rainbow Pavilion for pop music concerts.

Selective shows:

References

External links

Theatres Trust

Buildings and structures in Torquay
Theatres in Devon
Art Nouveau architecture in England
Grade II listed buildings in Devon